Warrant is a German speed metal band formed in 1983 in Düsseldorf. The band's members were Jörg Juraschek (vocals and bass), Thomas Klein (guitar), Oliver May (guitar) and Lothar Wieners (drums). Also Thomas Franke played all drums in 1985 studio recordings of both EP and LP and in 1999 recordings as well.

They went on tour with Warlock in 1985, after releasing an EP and an LP. The band soon split up.

In 1999, the band briefly reunited and recorded two new songs. Both of Warrant's albums were reissued on a single disc in 2000 with the new tracks included. In August 2010, Pure Steel Records announced the re-release of the albums.

Discography 
 First Strike (EP, 1985)
 The Enforcer (studio album, 1985)
 Metal Bridge (studio album, 2014)

References

External links 
 Official website
 
 

German heavy metal musical groups
German musical groups
Musical groups established in 1983
Musical quartets
Musical groups from Düsseldorf
Noise Records artists